The following is a partial list of rock formations in the India, by state:

Andhra Pradesh 
 Orvakal Rock Garden, Kurnool
 Natural Arch, Tirumala Hills

Rajasthan 
 Toad Rock, Mount Abu

Karnataka 
 Yana Rocks
 Sidlaphadi, Badami
 Peninsular Gneiss, Lalbagh, Bangalore
 Bugle Rock
 Hampi Boulders
 St. Mary's Islands of Columnar Basaltic Lava
 Rocks of Ramanagara: Ramdevarabetta, Savandurga, Revanasideshwara hill and Handigundi

Hyderabad

 1. “Bear’s Nose” inside Shilparamam, Madhapur
 2. “Cliff Rock”, Jubilee Hills
 3. Hillocks around Durgam Cheruvu Lake, Jubilee Hills
 4. “Monster Rock” near Film Nagar, Jubilee Hills
 5. “Obelisk”, Jubilee Hills
 6. “Mushroom Rock” inside the University of Hyderabad Campus
 7. Rock Park, on Old Bombay Road near Dargah Hussain Shah Wali
 8. Sentinel Rock, near Moula-Ali
 9. Rocks at Maula Ali's Dargah, Moula-Ali
 10. “Toadstool” next to Blue Cross, Jubilee Hills

Kerala 
 Phantom Rock, Wayanad

Madhya Pradesh
 Jabalpur Marble Rocks Madhya Pradesh, India
 Balancing Rock, Jabalpur

Maharashtra 
 Telbaila Rock formation, Lonavala
 Gilbert Hill, Mumbai
 Needle Hole Point or Elephant Point, Mahabaleshwar

Meghalaya 
 Kyllang Rock, Nongstoin
 Khoh Ramhah Rock, Cherrapunjee

Mizoram 
 Castle of Beino, Saphaw

Tamil Nadu 
 Pillar Rocks, Kodaikanal
 Krisna's Butterball, Mahabalipuram

Rock formations
 
Rock formations